The 169th Rifle Division was formed as an infantry division of the Red Army beginning in late August 1939, as part of the pre-war Soviet military build-up. It saw service in the occupation force in western Ukraine in September. The German invasion found it still in Ukraine, fighting back to the Dniepr until it was nearly destroyed. The partly-rebuilt division fought again at Kharkov, then was pulled back into reserve and sent deep into the Caucasus where it fought south of Stalingrad throughout that battle. Following another major redeployment the division helped in the liberation of Oryol, and the following race to the Dniepr. In 1944 and 1945 it was in 1st and 2nd Belorussian Fronts, participating successfully in the offensives that liberated Belarus, Poland, and conquered eastern Germany. It ended the war on the Elbe River.

Formation 
The 169th was based on a cadre from the 45th Rifle Regiment, and began forming on August 25 and into September 1939 at Kherson and Nikolaeyev in the Ukrainian Military District (later, the Odessa Military District). While still forming up it was officially in the third echelon of the Soviet forces taking part in the Soviet invasion of Poland.

Operation Barbarossa 
On June 22, 1941, the order of battle of the 169th was as follows:
 434th Rifle Regiment
 556th Rifle Regiment
 680th Rifle Regiment
 307th Light Artillery Regiment
 342nd Howitzer Regiment
 160th Antitank Battalion
 135th Antiaircraft Battalion
 171st Sapper Battalion
 159th Signal Battalion
 152nd Reconnaissance Battalion
As the enemy offensive began the division was spread over 65km in peacetime garrisons around Lipkany, Mogilev-Podolsk, and Grushka along the Dniestr River. On the 25th it was assigned to South Front, and fought under command of either the 9th or the 18th Army through June and July in 55th Rifle Corps. While in 18th Army the 169th was attempting to aid the breakout of the Soviet forces encircled in the Uman pocket. While directing his troops from his command post in the Pervomaisk area, General Turunov, commander of the division, was severely wounded by a shell fragment. He was evacuated by air to Kharkov, but died in hospital on August 3.

Retreating under pressure through the southern Ukraine, by Aug. 12 the division was reduced to two groups, one with a strength of 808 men, and one of just 603 men. The former group was destroyed on Aug. 14, and on the 16th the latter group was evacuated over the Dniepr to serve as a cadre for the rebuilding division. By Sept. 1 it was back in the line under command of 6th Army near Dnepropetrovsk. The order of battle had changed; the 135th Antiaircraft Battalion had been removed to become a separate unit. On Oct. 30 the 169th was in 38th Army of Southwestern Front with 4,787 officers and men in the ranks. On Dec. 26 the 342nd Howitzer Regiment was disbanded and the 307th Light Artillery Regiment became a standard divisional artillery regiment, while the reconnaissance battalion was reorganized as a company, with the same number. On Jan. 1, 1942, the divisional strength was 5,536 officers and men, half of what was authorized for a rifle division at that time, but about average compared to other such divisions.

Operation Blue  and Stalingrad 
In May and June 1942, the 169th fought under the command of 28th Army during the Second Battle of Kharkov, and the early stages of the German Operation Blue. German Sixth Army launched a preliminary attack, Operation Wilhelm, against the 28th Army bridgehead over the Donets at and south of Volchansk, from June 10–15. The division was caught up in this and was largely encircled in spite of beginning to retreat almost immediately; on the 13th Marshal Semyon Timoshenko reported it was "seriously battered". During the main operation, the army's defenses along the Oskol River were penetrated by XXXX Panzer Corps on June 30, but the resistance of the 169th helped limit the advance. By July 10, 28th Army reported the division "was fighting in the Zhuravka region with 100 fighters", and these remnants made their way south of the Don in the following days.

On July 27 the remnants of the division were withdrawn into the Reserve of the Supreme High Command. After over a month of rest and refitting, by Sept. 11 the division was back up to a strength of 8,028 officers and men; 6,679 new men arrived from hospitals, the Tashkent Machinegun-Mortar School, the Astrakhan Infantry School, and reserve regiments. On Oct. 29 it had reached nearly-full strength of 9,424 and was assigned to 57th Army on the west bank of the Volga, south of Stalingrad.

In mid-October, the commander of Stalingrad Front, Gen. A.I. Yeryomenko ordered an attack from the so-called Beketovka bridgehead in yet another attempt to break through to the encircled 62nd Army in the city, or at least to divert German forces from the battle there. The 169th was transferred to 64th Army for this purpose. In this operation, which began on Oct. 25 and continued until Nov. 2, the division served as a general reserve. While gaining little ground, these attacks served as a distraction for German Sixth Army.

Operation Uranus and Operation Ring 
In preparation for the strategic counteroffensive called Operation Uranus, the 169th was transferred back to 57th Army in early November and moved southwards, to the vicinity of Tundutovo and Ivanovka, and reinforced. For the offensive it was supported by 90th Tank Brigade, and made up about half of 57th Army's shock group, with the 422nd Rifle Division and more armor making up the other half. After a 75-minute artillery preparation the division stepped off at 1115 hours on Nov. 20 and easily penetrated the defenses of the under-strength Romanian 2nd Infantry Division, which suffered "tank fright" and was virtually routed in the first hour. By mid-afternoon the shock group had advanced 6 to 8 kilometres and the 169th had captured Khara-Uson, Erdeshkin and Nariman. In the evening the division came under attack by the German 29th Motorized Division, which drove it back from Nariman; quick action by the 90th Tank Brigade saved the day by engaging the German armor and destroying several tanks. The division lost 93 men killed and 257 wounded in this action. 13th Tank Corps soon entered this seesaw battle through the night and next day, until the German division was ordered northward towards Stalingrad, after which the 169th and its supporting tanks continued to exploit their penetration westwards. Within days the shock group ran up against the 29th Motorized once again, as well as the 297th Infantry Division, defending the strongpoints of Tsybenko and Kravtsov, and the advance became a siege.

Advance 
The counteroffensive took its toll, and by Dec. 4 the strength of the division was back down to a total of 5,574 men. Following the victory at Stalingrad, in March 1943, the 169th moved by rail northwards to Western Front. Here it was assigned to 16th Guards Rifle Corps in Gen. I.Kh. Bagramyan's 11th Guards Army. Under these commands the division fought in Operation Kutuzov, which reduced the Oryol salient and liberated the city of Oryol during July and August.

In late 1943 the 169th was assigned to 40th Rifle Corps in 3rd Army, where it would remain, almost continuously, until the end of the war. In late February 1944, 3rd Army was in 1st Belorussian Front during the Rogachyov-Zhlobin Operation, with the goal of seizing bridgeheads over the Dniepr River. During this fighting, the division distinguished itself in the liberation of Rogachyov, and received that town's name as an honorific.

At the outset of Operation Bagration, on June 23, 40th Rifle Corps began with a shattering artillery barrage of 45 minutes against the sector held by German XII Corps near Rogachyov, followed by regimental-sized attacks against the 267th Infantry and 18th Panzergrenadier Divisions. As the offensive unfolded, the 9th Tank Corps made a 200 km deep "raid" into the Minsk area, and the 169th organized a forward detachment in support, composed of the 434th Rifle Regiment loaded onto every truck available, plus the 160th Antitank Battalion, with extra troops from the "Burevestnik" Partisan Brigade picked up along the way. This successful exploitation earned the division the Order of the Red Banner, awarded on July 25 for the liberation of Volkovisk.

On January 2, 1945, just before the Vistula-Oder Offensive, the division had a strength of 6,712 troops, including 770 officers, 1,685 NCOs, and 4,257 enlisted; 42% of the division's personnel were either Communist Party members or Komsomols. After driving into East Prussia as part of 2nd Belorussian Front, the division was awarded the Order of Suvorov and later the Order of Kutuzov. When the war ended the 169th was on the Elbe River, 120 km west of Berlin. The men and women of the division had earned its full title: 169-я стрелковая Рогачевская Краснознамённая орденов Суворова и Кутузова дивизия (English: 169th Rifle, Rogachyov, Order of the Red Banner, Order of Suvorov, Order of Kutuzov Division), and six men had become Heroes of the Soviet Union.

Postwar 
According to STAVKA Order No. 11095 of May 29, 1945, part 6, the 169th is listed as one of the rifle divisions to be "disbanded in place". However, this was not carried out, and by the end of August the division had been relocated to Vitebsk.

According to Vitaly Feskov and his research team, even further after the war it was moved to Lepiel, still with the 40th Rifle Corps. The division was disbanded there in June 1946.

References

Citations

Bibliography

External links
Ivan Evdokimovich Turunov
Samuil Mironovich Rogachevski
Yakov Filippovich Yeryomenko
Fedor Andreevich Veryovkin

169
Military units and formations established in 1939
Military units and formations disestablished in the 1940s
Military units and formations awarded the Order of the Red Banner